Jack County is a county located in the north central part of the U.S. state of Texas. As of the 2020 census, its population was 8,472. Its county seat is Jacksboro. The county was created in 1856 and organized the next year. It is named for Patrick Churchill Jack and his brother William Houston Jack, both soldiers of the Texas Revolution.

Geography

Major highways
  U.S. Highway 281
  U.S. Highway 380
  State Highway 59
  State Highway 114
  State Highway 148
  State Highway 199

Adjacent counties
 Clay County (north)
 Montague County (northeast)
 Wise County (east)
 Parker County (southeast)
 Palo Pinto County (south)
 Young County (west)
 Archer County (northwest)

Demographics

Note: the US Census treats Hispanic/Latino as an ethnic category. This table excludes Latinos from the racial categories and assigns them to a separate category. Hispanics/Latinos can be of any race.

As of the 2000 census,  8,763 people, 3,047 households, and 2,227 families were residing in Jack County.  The population density was 10 people/sq mi (4/km2).  The 3,668 housing units averaged 4/sq mi (2/km2).  The racial makeup of the county was 88.68% White, 5.55% African American], 0.67% Native American, 0.27% Asian, 3.85% from other races, and 0.97% from two or more races. About 7.89% of the population were Hispanic]]s or Latinos of any race.

Of the 3,047 households,  32.7% had children under 18 living with them, 60.3% were married couples living together, 9.2% had a female householder with no husband present, and 26.9% were not families. About 24.5% of all households were made up of individuals, and 12.8% had someone living alone who was 65 or older.  The average household size was 2.52, and the average family size was 2.99. As of the 2010 census,  about 4.1 same-sex couples per 1,000 households were in the county.

In the county, the age distribution was 23.4% under 18, 10.0% from 18 to 24, 29.8% from 25 to 44, 21.6% from 45 to 64, and 15.20% who were 65 or older.  The median age was 37 years. For every 100 females, there were 120.40 males.  For every 100 females age 18 and over, there were 126.20 males.

The median income for a household in the county was $32,500, and for a family was $37,323. Males had a median income of $28,838 versus $20,216 for females. The per capita income for the county was $15,210.  About 10.1% of families and 12.9% of the population were below the poverty line, including 13.9% of those under age 18 and 13.7% of those age 65 or over.

Economy
The county is dominated by agriculture (mostly ranching), which has kept population density low. The extensive mechanization of agriculture has resulted in large farms and few workers.

A $200 million, 110 MW Keechi wind farm project with Enbridge, financed via a 20-year agreement with Microsoft, was announced in 2014.

Communities

Cities
 Bryson
 Jacksboro (county seat)

Census-designated place
 Perrin

Unincorporated communities
 Antelope
 Cundiff
 Gibtown
 Jermyn
 Joplin

Notable residents
 Frank Shelby Groner (1877-1943) was county attorney and later president of the College of Marshall.
 Edith Wilmans, first woman elected to the Texas State Legislature, lived near Vineyard, in Jack County, for some years after leaving office; she raised goats and cattle on her farm, and was a practicing lawyer.

Politics
Prior to 1952, Jack County was solidly Democratic in presidential elections similar to almost all of Texas & Solid South. From 1952 to 1996, the county was a swing county, though became somewhat of a bellwether earlier, voting for the national winner in all presidential elections from 1928 to 2004 except for 1960, 1968, & 1996. From 2000 on, the county has become a Republican Party stronghold, with its presidential candidates winning by increasing margins in each passing election. As a testament to how strongly Republican the county has swung, Donald Trump defeated Hillary Clinton by a margin of 79.4 percent in 2016, compared to an only 6.7 percent margin Bob Dole won the county by 20 years prior at the start of its Republican trend.

See also

 List of museums in North Texas
 National Register of Historic Places listings in Jack County, Texas
 Recorded Texas Historic Landmarks in Jack County

References

External links

 Jack County Web Site
 

 
1857 establishments in Texas
Populated places established in 1857